Wives – Ten Years After is a 1985 Norwegian drama film directed by Anja Breien. The film was selected as the Norwegian entry for the Best Foreign Language Film at the 58th Academy Awards, but was not accepted as a nominee.

Plot synopsis
Ten years have passed since our three heroines' first outing in 1975. Now the women meet at yet another class reunion. Not surprisingly, they are still unwilling to call it a night after the party is over. Husbands and children must celebrate Christmas as best they can, while the women spend quality time drinking and taking stock of their lives.

Cast
 Frøydis Armand as Heidrun
 Katja Medbøe as Kaja
 Anne Marie Ottersen as Mie

See also
 List of submissions to the 58th Academy Awards for Best Foreign Language Film
 List of Norwegian submissions for the Academy Award for Best Foreign Language Film

References

External links
 

1985 films
1985 drama films
Norwegian drama films
1980s Norwegian-language films
Films directed by Anja Breien